Ghost Train is a dark ride attraction at Blackpool Pleasure Beach, in Blackpool, Lancashire, England. It opened in 1930 as a single deck 'Pretzel' ride but was rebuilt and designed as an Art Deco double deck in 1936  by Joseph Emberton. It is notable as being the first to use the name of Ghost Train.  It has also undergone several refurbishments over its years of operation. Notably by Joeseph Emberton in 1936 (as mentioned) and again in 1957 by Jack Ratcliff, where it was moved up slightly from its original location to accommodate the Wild Mouse. This is the version we see today although originally it was not themed at all. It finally got a makeover with 'castle' theming in 1973 and a large skeleton on the top.

Design and history
In the 1920s, Pretzel rides were becoming a big hit in the United States of America. During the late 1920s, Blackpool Pleasure Beach decided to buy one of these types of dark rides. It was called the  "Ghost Train", based on the name of the popular play at the time, The Ghost Train. This was due to the term 'Pretzel Ride' not being known outside of America.

Today, the ride consists mainly of special effects using luminescent paint, lit by black-lights. Many scenes in the ride are based on horror stories, characters or films, such as Dracula and The Exorcist.

The ride has an open station, which is decorated with different creatures such as trolls, ghosts and witches (which have noticeably deteriorated over the years). The ride travels through the first section of scenes including a victim engulfed in cog wheels before going down a small drop in the station area and pulling up again to go into the second section featuring spiders, an exorcist girl in her bedroom and 3 skeleton cyclists. After the Trauma Towers ride at Blackpool Pleasure Beach closed at the end of the 2008 season, some of the scenes in Trauma Towers were reused in the Ghost Train ride, including the phantom who plays the organ.

A few of the changes to the ride include a flying skeleton head becoming a boiler and the druid scene becoming the exorcist girl. A whole section of the ride was changed from an Egyptian scene with a mummy and a spike coffin to a forest with corpses strapped to a gate and some snake-like creatures. It was also originally a single-level coaster with no dip, and the date of the last complete rebuild was 1957.

Music
The ride uses the song "Impressions of Sorcerer" by Tangerine Dream at some parts of the ride. The song was written for the film Sorcerer and notably the drum beat and electric guitar sections of the song have been removed for the ride.

Ghost sighting
Ghost Train has received media coverage for paranormal events reported by guests and staff over the years. Some attribute the mysterious activity to a ghost that locals call Cloggy, who is believed to be a former ride operator known to have worn clogs. In 2004, the ride was featured on an episode of Most Haunted Live!, a paranormal reality television series that performed an investigation at the park.

References

Blackpool Pleasure Beach
Amusement rides introduced in 1930